In mathematics, d'Alembert's equation is a first order nonlinear ordinary differential equation, named after the French mathematician Jean le Rond d'Alembert. The equation reads as

where . After differentiating once, and rearranging we have

The above equation is linear. When , d'Alembert's equation is reduced to Clairaut's equation.

References

Equations of physics
Mathematical physics
Differential equations
Ordinary differential equations